In mathematics, brackets of various typographical forms, such as parentheses ( ), square brackets [ ], braces { } and angle brackets ⟨ ⟩, are frequently used in mathematical notation. Generally, such bracketing denotes some form of grouping: in evaluating an expression containing a bracketed sub-expression, the operators in the sub-expression take precedence over those surrounding it. Sometimes, for the clarity of reading, different kinds of brackets are used to express the same meaning of precedence in a single expression with deep nesting of sub-expressions.

Historically, other notations, such as the vinculum, were similarly used for grouping. In present-day use, these notations all have specific meanings. The earliest use of brackets to indicate aggregation (i.e. grouping) was suggested in 1608 by Christopher Clavius, and in 1629 by Albert Girard.

Symbols for representing angle brackets
A variety of different symbols are used to represent angle brackets. In e-mail and other ASCII text, it is common to use the less-than (<) and greater-than (>) signs to represent angle brackets, because ASCII does not include angle brackets. 

Unicode has pairs of dedicated characters; other than less-than and greater-than symbols, these include:

  and 
  and 
  and 
  and 

In LaTeX the markup is \langle and \rangle: .

Non-mathematical angled brackets include:

There are additional dingbats with increased line thickness, and some angle quotation marks and deprecated characters.

Algebra

In elementary algebra, parentheses are used to specify the order of operations. Terms inside the bracket are evaluated first; hence 2×(3 + 4) is 14,  is 2 and (2×3) + 4 is 10. This notation is extended to cover more general algebra involving variables: for example . Square brackets are also often used in place of a second set of parentheses when they are nested—so as to provide a visual distinction.

In mathematical expressions in general, parentheses are also used to indicate grouping (i.e., which parts belong together) when necessary to avoid ambiguities and improve clarity.

Functions
The arguments to a function are frequently surrounded by brackets: . When there is little chance of ambiguity, it is common to omit the parentheses around the argument altogether (e.g.).

Coordinates and vectors

In the Cartesian coordinate system, brackets are used to specify the coordinates of a point. For example, (2,3) denotes the point with x-coordinate 2 and y-coordinate 3. 

Intervals

Both parentheses,, and square brackets, [ ], can also be used to denote an interval. That is,  would be the set of all real numbers between 5 and 12, including 5 but not 12. Here, the numbers may come as close as they like to 12, including 11.999 and so forth (with any finite number of 9s), but 12.0 is not included. 

In some European countries, the notation  is also used for this, and wherever comma is used as decimal separator, semicolon might be used as a separator to avoid ambiguity (e.g.).

The endpoint adjoining the square bracket is known as closed, while the endpoint adjoining the parenthesis is known as open. If both types of brackets are the same, the entire interval may be referred to as closed or open as appropriate. Whenever infinity or negative infinity is used as an endpoint (in the case of intervals on the real number line), it is always considered open and adjoined to a parenthesis. The endpoint can be closed when considering intervals on the extended real number line.

That is,  would correspond to the set .

Sets and groups
Braces { } are used to identify the elements of a set. For example, {a,b,c} denotes a set of three elements a, b and c. 

Angle brackets ⟨ ⟩ are used in group theory and commutative algebra to specify group presentations, and to denote the subgroup or ideal generated by a collection of elements.

Matrices
An explicitly given matrix is commonly written between large round or square brackets:

Derivatives
The notation

stands for the n-th derivative of function f, applied to argument x. So, for example, if , then .

Falling and rising factorial

The notation  is used to denote the falling factorial, an n-th degree polynomial defined by

Alternatively, the same notation may be encountered as representing the rising factorial, also called "Pochhammer symbol". It can be defined by

Quantum mechanics
In quantum mechanics, angle brackets are also used as part of Dirac's formalism, bra–ket notation, to denote vectors from the dual spaces of the bra  and the ket . 

In statistical mechanics, angle brackets denote ensemble or time average.

Polynomial rings
Square brackets are used to contain the variable(s) in polynomial rings. For example,  is the ring of polynomials with real number coefficients and variable .

Subring generated by an element or collection of elements

Lie bracket and commutator
In group theory and ring theory, square brackets are used to denote the commutator. In group theory, the commutator [g,h] is commonly defined as g−1h−1gh.  In ring theory, the commutator [a,b] is defined as ab − ba.  Furthermore, braces may be used to denote the anticommutator: {a,b} is defined as ab + ba.  

By using the commutator as a Lie bracket, every associative algebra can be turned into a Lie algebra. There are many different forms of Lie bracket, in particular the Lie derivative and the Jacobi–Lie bracket.

Floor/ceiling functions and fractional part

See also
Binomial coefficient
Bracket polynomial
Bra-ket notation
Delimiter
Dyck language
Frölicher–Nijenhuis bracket
Iverson bracket
Nijenhuis–Richardson bracket, also known as algebraic bracket.
Pochhammer symbol
Poisson bracket
Schouten–Nijenhuis bracket

Notes 

Arithmetic
Mathematical notation